The Rorspitzli is a mountain of the Urner Alps, located west of Wassen and Göschenen in the canton of Uri. It lies on the range east of the Sustenjoch, culminating at the Fleckistock.

References

External links
 Rorspitzli on Hikr

Mountains of the Alps
Alpine three-thousanders
Mountains of Switzerland
Mountains of the canton of Uri